The 2016–17 Metal Ligaen season was the 60th season of ice hockey in Denmark. Ten teams participated in the league. Esbjerg Energy defended their 2016 Danish championship title by defeating Gentofte Stars four games to one in the finals. The regular season begun on 23 September 2016 and ended on 28 February 2017. The last final was played on 16 April 2017.

Teams 

Teams licensed to play in the Metal Ligaen 2016–17

Source: Eliteprospects.com

Regular season

League table

Play-offs

g.The score for third place is goals, not games.

TV coverage

TV 2 Sport got the rights of covering the 2016–17 season of Metal Ligaen.

Regular season

Source: Metal Ligaen

Player statistics

Scoring leaders
The following players led the league in regular season points at the conclusion of games played on February 28, 2017.

References

External links
 Metal Ligaen official website

Dan
2015 in Danish sport
2016 in Danish sport
Seasons in Superisligaen